The short-furred dasyure (Murexia longicaudata), also known as the short-haired marsupial mouse, is a member of the order Dasyuromorphia. It was once recognised as the only species in the genus Murexia, but now five species are recognised. It lives in Papua, Indonesia and Papua New Guinea.

Conservation Status 
Its population is considered stable, so the species is listed as "Least Concern" by the IUCN.

Systematics 
The short-furred dasyure used to form the genus Murexia together with the broard-striped dasyure. In 2005, Colin Groves divided the genus Murexia into two monotypic genera, Murexia for the short-furred dasyure and Paramurexia for the broad-striped dasyure, based on cladistic analyses.

References

External links
 
 Columbia Encyclopedia entry

Dasyuromorphs
Mammals of Papua New Guinea
Mammals of Western New Guinea
Mammals described in 1866
Marsupials of New Guinea